Duel for Nothing (Hungarian: Párbaj semmiért) is a 1940 Hungarian drama film directed by Emil Martonffy and starring Gyula Csortos, Lili Berky and Alice Nagy. It was based on a novel by Sándor Hunyady.

Plot summary

Cast
 Gyula Csortos - Török Kálmán 
 Lili Berky - Törökné 
 Alice Nagy - Kati, Törökék lánya 
 Artúr Somlay - Csaholy Kelemen báró 
 Piri Vaszary - Csaholyné, Emma 
 Jenö Pataky - Gazsi, Csaholyék fia 
 József Bihari - Balázs 
 Sándor Tompa - Plébános 
 László Misoga - Rudi, cigány 
 Lajos Köpeczi Boócz - Állatorvos 
 Gusztáv Pártos - Angol kutyakereskedõ 
 Sándor Pethes - Gyógyszerész 
 Endre C. Turáni - Parasztfiú 
 István Falussy - Lóversenyfogadó 
 Gyözö Kabók - öreg parasztember 
 Ferenc Pethes - Lajos 
 Dezsö Szalóky - öreg parasztember 
 Gusztáv Vándory - Párbajsegéd

References

External links
 

1940 films
Hungarian drama films
1940s Hungarian-language films
Films directed by Emil Martonffy
Films based on Hungarian novels
1940 drama films
Hungarian black-and-white films